Cretagalathea exigua is an extinct species of squat lobster in the family Munididae. It is the single member of the genus Cretagalathea.

References

Squat lobsters
Crustaceans described in 2008